Love Story is an Indian television drama, produced by Hindi film director Anurag Basu and directed by Ravi Davala. The series was on SAB TV from 30 April 2007 to 17 January 2008.

Plot 
The show is based on the love story of Akash and Shruti. Their egos clash and battles are fought. What begins as an innocent boy meets girl romance soon turns into a drawn-out fight for power and love. Personalities clash, egos are tested and relationships strained, all owing to this love affair. Welcome to the world of thought-provoking love and war, welcome to the lives of Akash and Shruti.
It's a star-crossed violent love story in the Romeo-Juliet mode, set in contemporary Delhi. Akash is the typical brooding hero, perhaps carrying the burden of the upheaval in the lives of his parents ACP Rohit Sehgal and Ritu who are separated. From being a talented student once, he has slipped to being a backbencher and a goon. Yet his rugged charm attracts the girls, especially his cute junior in college, Shruti. They fall in love and all hell breaks loose on Akash. Shruti's uncle, a local don and politician who had once been sent to jail by Rohit and her brother Kunaal, head of a rival gang in college are always at loggerheads with Akash. The lovers elope, but Akash is hunted down and shot. As he lies fighting for his life in the hospital, the story takes off, oscillating between the present and the past, told through flashbacks.
Shruti falls in love with Akash at first sight. Akash begins to take a like for her, but doesn't believe in relationships as at a young age he saw his parents relationship break. Shruti who is heart broken, takes a friend's advice and decides to make Akash jealous. Shruti starts spending time with Dev, one of Akash's best friends. The plan works and Akash gets jealous and eventually they get together. Dev too falls for Shruti, but decides to move on. Shruti and Akash want to get married, so Shruti tells her uncle about him, but he refuses. Her uncle plans to get her married to someone else, so Akash and Shruti decide to run. Kunaal tries to stop Akash and Bhatti, when Kunaal is accidentally shot and he dies. Police are trying to catch Akash and Bhatti and they are on the run. Eventually even Shruti runs away with Akash and they are together. Akash and Shruti plan to get married, but Akash is shot by the police. He is taken to hospital. Eventually Akash is caught and among the many charges comes the charge of killing Kunnal. Eventually the court proceedings prove that Kunaal's death was an accident and no one was at fault. But Akash and Bhatti are sentenced to 5 years in jail for the crimes they committed while on the run from the police. Meanwhile Shruti waits for her (now husband) Akash. She becomes pregnant with Akash's child and has a baby girl named Aarushi. Shruti is helped by Dev.

Five years later Akash and Bhatti are released from jail. Misunderstandings happen between Shruti and Akash, but they solve it. At one point, Bhatti finds out everything that all of this had been planned by Dev; he shot Kunaal so he could blame the murder on Akash and send him to jail and get his love Shruti. Dev pleads Bhatti to side with him but when he refuses kills him with the same handgun used to kill Kunaal. Dev creates misunderstandings between Akash and Shruti. He gets Akash alone, then tries to kill him when Shruti and the police come there. Shruti tries to stop him, but he points the gun at her, she closes her eyes, and Dev is heartbroken seeing that Shruti thought he would shoot her and also that she wouldn't ever love him. A bullet is shot. Dev shoots and kills himself. The scene ends with Akash and Dev lying on both sides of Shruti.

Cast 
Mishal Raheja as Akash Sehgal
Payel Sarkar as Shruti Shekhawat
Harsh Chhaya as ACP Rohit Sehgal (Akash's father)
Roopa Ganguly as Ritu (Akash's mother)
Pritam Choudhury 
Rohan Tiwari as Bhatti (Akash and Dev's friend)
Ajay Chaudhary as Dev (Akash and Bhatti's friend)
Deeya Chopra as Jhilmil (Shruti's friend)
 Vineet Kumar Chaudhary as Arjun Shekhawat (Shruti's cousin brother)
Ritu Vij as Shruti's Taiji (Aunt, Kunal's mother)
Priyanka 
Mohit Daga
Sandeep
Amarinder Sodhi 
Virender Sharma 
Puneet Issar 
Somya Adlakha
Akiv Ali
Jasbir Thandi as Bhatti's Father

Music composer
 Abhijeet Hegdepatil

External links 
 Official Site

Sony SAB original programming
Indian drama television series
2007 Indian television series debuts
2008 Indian television series endings
Television shows set in Delhi
Hindi-language television shows
Indian television soap operas